The Robert Award for Best Production Design is one of the merit awards presented by the Danish Film Academy at the annual Robert Awards ceremony. The award has been handed out since 1984, except in 1991.

Honorees

1980s 
 1984: Palle Nybo Arestrup for 
 1985:  for The Element of Crime
 1986: Henning Bahs for 
 1987: Leif Sylvester Petersen for The Dark Side of the Moon
 1988: Anna Asp for Pelle the Conqueror
 1989: Palle Nybo Arestrup for

1990s 
 1990: Henning Bahs for The Miracle in Valby
 1991: Not awarded
 1992: Henning Bahs for Europa
 1993:  for Sofie
 1994:  for Black Harvest
 1995: Palle Nybo Arestrup for Carl, My Childhood Symphony
 1996: Viggo Bentzon for 
 1997: Karl Juliusson for Breaking the Waves
 1998:  for The Island on Bird Street
 1999: Thomas Ravn for Skyggen

2000s 
 2000: Karl Juliusson for 
 2001: Karl Juliusson for Dancer in the Dark
 2002: Søren Skjær for Chop Chop
 2003: Steffen Aarfing and Marie í Dali for I Am Dina
 2004: Ben van Os and Jette Lehmann for It's All About Love
 2005: Niels Sejer for King's Game
 2006: Jette Lehmann for Nordkraft
 2007: Peter De Neergaard for 
 2008: Niels Sejer for Island of Lost Souls
 2009: Jette Lehmann for Flame & Citron

2010s 
 2010: Søren Kragh Sørensen and Finn Richardt for Aching Hearts
 2011: Torben Stig Nielsen for Submarino
 2012: Jette Lehmann for Melancholia
 2013: Niels Sejer for A Royal Affair
 2014: Thomas Greve for 
 2015: Sabine Hviid for When Animals Dream
 2016: Mia Steensgaard for Mænd og høns
 2017: Sabine Hviid for The Day Will Come
 2018: Gustav Pontoppidan for Winter Brothers
 2019: Jette Lehmann for A Fortunate Man

2020s 
 2020: Josephine Farsø for 
 2021: Rie Lykke for

See also 

 Henning Bahs Award - the production design award at the Bodil Awards

References

External links 
  

1984 establishments in Denmark
Awards established in 1984
Awards for best art direction
Production